The Leonardo da Vinci Medal is the highest award of the Society for the History of Technology (SHOT), and was first given in 1962. In general this award is granted annually to scholars who have contributed outstandingly to the history of technology through research, teaching, publication or other activities. The prize consists of a certificate and a medal.

List of recipients

 1962 Robert James Forbes
 1963 Abbott Payson Usher
 1964 Lynn T. White, Jr.
 1965 Maurice Daumas
 1966 Cyril Stanley Smith
 1967 Melvin Kranzberg
 1968 Joseph Needham
 1969 Lewis Mumford
 1970 Bertrand Gille
 1971 A. G. Drachmann
 1972 Ladislao Reti
 1973 Carl W. Condit
 1974 Bern Dibner
 1975 Friedrich Klemm
 1976 Derek J. de Solla Price
 1977 Eugene S. Ferguson
 1978 Torsten Althin
 1979 John U. Nef
 1980 John Bell Rae
 1981 Donald S. L. Cardwell
 1982 not awarded
 1983 Louis C. Hunter
 1984 Brooke Hindle
 1985 Thomas P. Hughes
 1986 Hugh G. J. Aitken
 1987 Robert P. Multhauf
 1988 Sidney M. Edelstein
 1989 R. Angus Buchanan
 1990 Edwin T. Layton, Jr.
 1991 Carroll W. Pursell
 1992 Otto Mayr
 1993 W. David Lewis
 1994 Merritt Roe Smith
 1995 Bruce Sinclair
 1996 Nathan Rosenberg
 1997 Ruth Schwartz Cowan
 1998 Walter G. Vincenti
 1999 not awarded
 2000 Silvio A. Bedini
 2001 Robert C. Post
 2002 Leo Marx
 2003 Bart Hacker
 2004 David Landes
 2005 David E. Nye
 2006 Eric H. Robinson
 2007 David A. Hounshell
 2008 Joel A. Tarr
 2009 Susan J. Douglas
 2010 Svante Lindqvist
 2011 John M. Staudenmaier
 2012 Wiebe Bijker
 2013 Rosalind Williams
 2014 Pamela O. Long
 2015 Johan Schot
 2016 Ronald R. Kline
 2017 Arnold Pacey
 2018 Joy Parr
 2019 Francesca Bray
 2020 Maria Paula Diogo
 2020 Arthur P. Molella
 2021 Suzanne Moon

References

External links 
 The Leonardo da Vinci Medal – Society for the History of Technology

Awards established in 1962
History of science awards
History of technology